Rialah is one of the 51 union councils of Abbottabad District in Khyber-Pakhtunkhwa province of Pakistan. According to the 2017 Census of Pakistan, the population is 13,562.

Subdivisions
 Kala Ban
 Longal
 Malkot
 Rialah

References

Union councils of Abbottabad District